Graziella is a 1926 French silent drama film directed by Marcel Vandal and starring Suzanne Dehelly, Antonin Artaud and Raoul Chennevières. It is an adaptation of the 1852 novel Graziella by Alphonse de Lamartine.

Cast
 Suzanne Dehelly as Graziella  
 Antonin Artaud as Cecco, le fiancé de Graziella  
 Raoul Chennevières as Andréa, le grand-père  
 Georges Chebat as Beppo  
 Sylviane de Castillo as Madame de Lamartine  
 Révérend as Le père de Cecco  
 Nina Vanna
 Jean Dehelly as Alphonse de Lamartine  
 Émile Dehelly as Alphonse de Lamartine âgé  
 Madame Sapiani as La grand-mère  
 Michel Sym as de Virieux

References

Bibliography
 Goble, Alan. The Complete Index to Literary Sources in Film. Walter de Gruyter, 1999.

External links

1926 films
1926 drama films
French drama films
French silent films
1920s French-language films
Films based on French novels
Films set in Naples
Films directed by Marcel Vandal
French black-and-white films
Silent drama films
1920s French films